"Don't Go" is a song by American record producer Skrillex, Canadian singer Justin Bieber, and American rapper and singer Don Toliver. It was released as a single through Atlantic Records and Owsla on August 20, 2021. Production was handled by Skrillex and Harv, while the vocals were handled by Bieber and Toliver. All four wrote the song alongside Poo Bear, Beam, Aldae, Carlton McDowell, Jr., Jordan Douglas, and Drew Gold.

Background
Speaking about "Don't Go", Skrillex explained that he thought of Bieber while creating the instrumental, with Toliver later being part of the song. He further said: "The song is a beautiful mess of organic energy melting together. For every 100 people listening to it, I hope there are 100 different interpretations". The song was originally supposed to appear on Bieber's sixth studio album, Justice (2021), but did not end up making the final cut of the album, which led to the song later being released as a single as himself and Skrillex thought that it was "fire".

Composition and lyrics
"Don't Go" is an R&B song that is set in the key of B major with a tempo of 135 beats per minute. It contains "vibrant" bass-heavy production and finds Bieber and Toliver singing about their respective significant others to remain by their side. On the chorus, Bieber sings: "I put in the work to hear you say (Don't go, don't—)/ Misery missin' your company (Don't go, don't go)/ See 'em pullin' at you that way (Don't go, don't)/ Ooh, if this is where you supposed to be (Don't go)". Bieber and Australian rapper and singer the Kid Laroi discussed a similar theme on their chart-topping 2021 single, "Stay".

Release and promotion
On October 28, 2020, Skrillex and Bieber were seen recording in a music studio alongside producers and songwriters Harv and Poo Bear, along with Jon Bellion, Maejor, and Ant Clemons, among others. The two announced the collaboration and release date of the song on August 16, 2021. Two days later, the two artists revealed the title of the song along with a snippet, in which the cover art was revealed as part of the pre-save.

Critical reception
Upon release, "Don't Go" received positive reviews from music critics, majority of whom praised Skrillex's production and his chemistry with Bieber on the track. Two days before the song was released, on August 18, 2021, Jason Heffler of EDM felt that Skrillex, Bieber, and Toliver have "cooked up a woozy R&B banger, a slow-burner rife with the hypnotic yet forceful bass of a contemporary Skrillex production", basing it on the snippet that was shared that day. Karlie Powell of Your EDM stated that "the production is smooth as can be with a booming baseline, accented by creative rhythm and flow" and "if it sounds like a hit, it's probably a hit!". Writing for Billboard, Katie Bain felt that "the song is a dreamy R&B number, with Skrillex's production sitting well back to enable Bieber and Toliver's vocals to dominate". Shaad D'Souza of Paper wrote that the pairing of Bieber and Skrillex resulted in "a woozier, looser song than we've come to expect", but still called it "brilliant and infectious". Uproxx's Carolyn Droke felt that the combination of "acoustic guitar and a network of electronic notes for a moving beat" made for "intricate production". Issy Sampson of The Guardian called the track "a moody, moany banger" and "an overdue return to form for the Bieber".

Music video
The official music video for "Don't Go", directed by Salomon Ligthelm, premiered to Skrillex's YouTube channel alongside the song on August 20, 2021. It sees himself, Bieber, and Toliver surrounded in an art museum that shows art of them at different exhibits. The paintings have tears coming from them. Before the video ends, all artists turn to gold.

Credits and personnel

 Skrillex – production, songwriting, all instruments, programming, mixing
 Justin Bieber – vocals, songwriting
 Don Toliver – vocals, songwriting
 Harv – production, songwriting, guitar, all instruments, programming
 Poo Bear – songwriting
 Beam – songwriting
 Aldae – songwriting
 Carlton McDowell, Jr. – songwriting, guitar
 Jordan Douglas – songwriting
 Drew Gold – songwriting, recording
 Josh Gudwin – vocal production, recording
 Derek "206Derek" Anderson – recording
 Dhamari Trice Hanson “Dusjni” - guitar production
 Manny Marroquin – mixing
 Mike Bozzi – mastering

Charts

Release history

References

2021 singles
2021 songs
Don Toliver songs
Justin Bieber songs
Skrillex songs
Song recordings produced by Harv
Song recordings produced by Skrillex
Songs about parting
Songs written by Don Toliver
Songs written by Gregory Hein
Songs written by Harv
Songs written by Justin Bieber
Songs written by Poo Bear
Songs written by Skrillex